Contextual architecture, also known as Contextualism is a philosophical approach in architectural theory that refers to the designing of a structure in response to the literal and abstract characteristics of the environment in which it is built. Contextual architecture contrasts modernist architecture, which value the imposition of their own characteristics and values upon the built environment.

Contextual architecture is usually divided into three categories: vernacular architecture, regional architecture, and critical regionalism all of which also inform the complementary architecture movement.

Etymology 

The term contextualism is derived from the Latin , meaning to weave together or to join. The term was first applied to the arts and architecture by the aesthetician and philosopher Stephen C. Pepper in the 1960s, who originally coined the word as applied to philosophy.

History 
The essential ideas of Contextualism in architecture long preceded the term's coinage. The Roman notion of genius loci, Renaissance decorum, and Beaux Arts tirer parti mirror modern definitions of contextualism. 

The 1920s development of Gestalt psychology, which investigated the ways in which independent parts could be combined to make a cohesive result, provided the intellectual foundation for the philosophy. Contextualism as applied to architecture was first championed in the 1960s by architect Colin Rowe as a reaction to modernist architecture, which valued universality and the projection of utopian ideals onto sites. Pushing back against the perceived failure of modernist buildings to adapt cohesively with their environments – in particular with cities' historic buildings, Rowe advocated for architecture that was designed with a focus on existing in continuity with the surrounding features of the built and natural environments. Rowe notably advocated for the use of figure-ground diagrams as a method of understanding the existing features surrounding a site's surrounding environment.

Contextualist philosophy experienced a revival later in the 20th century with the advent of the New Urbanism movement, which stressed "context-appropriate architecture" in urban design, particularly in the context of environmentalism.

Criticism 
Contextualism, particularly in the decades following the 1980s, has faced criticism for its association with postmodernism and perceived conformism. Architectural pragmatist Rem Koolhaas' assertion "fuck context" served as an infamous rallying cry against contextualism.

In 1988, while curating an exhibition on Deconstructivism at MoMA, architects Philip Johnson and Mark Wigley denounced the philosophy, stating "contextualism has been used as an excuse for mediocrity, for a dumb servility to the familiar."

Notable examples 

 Olympic Archery Range, Barcelona, Carme Pinós and Enric Miralles (1992)
 Water (Honpuku) Temple, Awaji, (Japanese: **E1-. *ME), Tadao Ando (1991)
 City Gate (Valletta), Malta, Renzo Piano (2015)
 Kingo Houses, Helsingør, Jørn Utzon (1958)

References 

Architectural theory